Franconian Switzerland-Veldenstein Forest Nature Park is a nature park in North Bavaria. The nature park was established in 1995 and it covers an area that is almost coextensive with the natural region major unit of Northern Franconian Jura, the park being slightly larger. 

With an area of  it is the second largest nature park in Bavaria after the Altmühl Valley Nature Park. The park's sponsors are the Franconian Switzerland-Veldenstein Forest Nature Park Society (Verein Naturpark Fränkische Schweiz-Veldensteiner Forst), founded in 1968, with its head office in Pottenstein.

The park covers much of the regions of Franconian Switzerland and the Veldenstein Forest from which it derives its name.

See also 
 List of nature parks in Germany

External links 

Franconian Switzerland Nature Park
Franconian Switzerland-Veldenstein Forest Nature Park
Frankenweg Run
Sights and tourist destinations in the nature park

Nature parks in Bavaria
Franconia